"Stripped" is a song by British electronic music band Depeche Mode. It was released as the lead single from their fifth studio album Black Celebration (1986) on 10 February 1986, through Mute Records. Written by the band's lead songwriter Martin Gore, "Stripped" has been described as an "ominous and intriguing pop song." It incorporates various samples into its instrumental; most notably, the sound of an idling motorcycle engine was recorded, altered slightly, and inserted as a percussive element.

It was the band's sixth consecutive single to enter the UK Top 20, peaking at number 15. Elsewhere, it peaked at number 4 in Germany and reached the top 10 in Finland, Sweden and Switzerland. German metal band Rammstein later covered the song for the 1998 Depeche Mode tribute album For the Masses.

Composition

John Freeman of The Quietus described "Stripped" as an "ominous and intriguing pop song" that is lyrically akin to other songs written by Martin Gore featuring sensual lyrics about the human body. Parts of the song's instrumental are constructed from audio samples. The beginning of the song samples the sound of the ignition of lead singer Dave Gahan's Porsche automobile, while the underlying beat is the sound of an idling motorcycle engine distorted and slowed. The ending also incorporates the sound of fireworks.

Release

The 7" B-side for "Stripped" is "But Not Tonight". The other two B-sides are "Breathing in Fumes" and "Black Day". "Breathing in Fumes" was a new song using samples from "Stripped", mixed by the band and Thomas Stiehler. "Black Day" is an acoustic, alternate version of "Black Celebration" sung by Martin Gore and co-written by him, Alan Wilder, and producer Daniel Miller—the only Depeche Mode song for which Miller receives a writing credit.

"But Not Tonight" was included on the American release of Black Celebration as the 12th and final track on the album, following "New Dress"; the album's initial UK CD release also includes the extended remix of "But Not Tonight", along with "Black Day" and "Breathing in Fumes", as bonus tracks. "But Not Tonight," which was heard in the film Modern Girls, was released as the A-side of the "Stripped" single in the U.S. Martin Gore expressed his frustration with the American release in the 2007 documentary The Songs Aren't Good Enough, There Aren't Any Singles and It'll Never Get Played on the Radio:The worst thing, though, about "Stripped" was the Americans, who somehow decided to not release it at all and to put out the B-side, "But Not Tonight," because they got it into some dodgy film. [For] "Stripped", we took nine days mixing and God knows how long recording, and, you know, "But Not Tonight" I think we did in about three hours. And the Americans in their wisdom decided to release that instead.

The "Highland Mix" of "Stripped" was mixed by Mark Ellis (better known as Flood), who in the future would produce Depeche Mode's Violator and Songs of Faith and Devotion records.

Background 
Andy Fletcher discussed in a 1986 issue of No.1 magazine. "The idea of 'Stripped' is to get away from technology and civilisation for a day and get back to basics in the country. It's about two people stripping down to their bare emotions. In the video we're seen demolishing a car and taking a TV apart... it's a bit, er, symbolic." Dave Gahan also stated: "It's not about sex. It's to do with having nothing except yourself. The people in the song could strip off if they wanted to though. The song is also a bit chancy. It doesn't capture you immediately. Some people hear it and say 'Is that it?' Others go 'Brilliant!'."

Music videos
The music video for "Stripped" was the last Depeche Mode video to be directed by Peter Care and was filmed outside Hansa Studios in Berlin. A music video was also shot for the B-side "But Not Tonight" and was directed by Tamra Davis. Two differently cut versions of both "Stripped" and "But Not Tonight" are available on the band's Video Singles Collection release.

Track listings

7": Mute / 7Bong10 (UK)
 "Stripped" – 3:52
 "But Not Tonight" – 4:15

12": Mute / 12Bong10 (UK)
 "Stripped (Highland Mix)" – 6:42
 "But Not Tonight (Extended Remix)" – 5:13
 "Breathing in Fumes" – 6:07
 "Fly on the Windscreen (Quiet Mix)" – 4:24
 "Black Day" – 2:37

CD: Mute / CDBong10 (UK)
 "Stripped" – 3:52
 "But Not Tonight" – 4:15
 "Stripped (Highland Mix)" – 6:42
 "But Not Tonight (Extended Remix)" – 5:13
 "Breathing in Fumes" – 6:07
 "Fly on the Windscreen (Quiet Mix)" – 4:24
 "Black Day" – 2:37

The CD single was released in 1991 as part of the singles box set compilations.

7": Sire / 7-28564 (US)
 "But Not Tonight" [*] – 3:52
 "Stripped " – 3:59

12": Sire / 0-20578 (US)
 "But Not Tonight (Extended Mix)" [*] – 6:18
 "Breathing in Fumes" – 6:07
 "Stripped (Highland Mix)" – 6:42
 "Black Day" – 2:37

[*] The 7" and 12" versions on the US "But Not Tonight" single are different versions than used on the UK singles – they were remixed by Robert Margouleff. The 12" mix later appeared on the rare fourth disc of Depeche Mode's remix compilation, Remixes 81–04, as the "Margouleff Dance Mix."

CD: Intercord / INT 826.835 (Germany)
 "Stripped (Highland Mix)" – 6:42
 "But Not Tonight (Extended Remix)" – 5:12 [*]
 "Breathing in Fumes" – 6:07
 "Fly on the Windscreen (Quiet Mix)" – 4:24
 "Black Day" – 2:37

[*] This is the UK Extended 12" version. 
The German CD was released in 1986

All songs written by Martin Gore except "Black Day" which is written by Gore, Alan Wilder, and Daniel Miller

Charts

Weekly charts

Year-end charts

In Australia, "Stripped" missed the Kent Music Report top 100 singles chart, but was listed as one of the singles receiving significant sales reports beyond the top 100 for six non-consecutive weeks in May and June 1986, with its highest ranking being fourth on this list.

Rammstein cover

Neue Deutsche Härte band Rammstein recorded a cover of "Stripped" for the 1998 Depeche Mode tribute album For the Masses. This version cut the line "Let me see you stripped down to the bone" to "Let me see you stripped" because of singer Till Lindemann's difficulty singing "down to the bone" in a manner that fit with the rest of the song (the entire line is restored in the "Heavy Mental Mix" by Charlie Clouser). Released as a single on 28 July 1998, it reached number 14 on the German single charts. The song also appears as the twelfth track on some special editions of the band's sophomore release, Sehnsucht (1997). It was also the band's first song done entirely in English.

The video for the song incorporated footage from Olympia, a documentary film on the 1936 Summer Olympics directed by Leni Riefenstahl. Following the Second World War Riefenstahl was classified as a Nazi sympathizer by postwar authorities; the choice to use footage from a film by her led to threats against the band. Members of the band praised Riefenstahl's filmmaking abilities and aesthetic choices in a 2011 documentary of the making of the video, particularly the imagery of the athletes, while simultaneously disassociating themselves from Riefenstahl's political views. Members of Depeche Mode, especially Dave Gahan, responded positively to the cover, since it was so different from any other versions of Depeche Mode's work.

Track listing
 "Stripped" – 4:25
 "Stripped (Psilonaut Mix by Johan Edlund-Tiamat)" – 4:28
 "Stripped (Heavy Mental Mix by Charlie Clouser)" – 5:12
 "Stripped (Tribute to Düsseldorf Mix by Charlie Clouser)" – 5:10
 "Stripped (FKK Mix by Günter Schulz-KMFDM)" – 4:35
 "Wollt ihr das bett in Flammen sehen? (Live Arena, Berlin '96)" [Video] – 5:01

Charts

Weekly charts

Year-end charts

References

External links
 Single information from the official Depeche Mode web site
 AllMusic review

1986 singles
1998 singles
Depeche Mode songs
Rammstein songs
Songs written by Martin Gore
Song recordings produced by Daniel Miller
Song recordings produced by Gareth Jones
Music videos directed by Tamra Davis
1986 songs
Mute Records singles
UK Independent Singles Chart number-one singles